Kafrul is a Thana of Dhaka District in the Division of Dhaka, Bangladesh.

Geography 
Its total area is 17.8 km2.

Demographics 
This Kafrul has a population of 164396. Males constitute 53.78% of the population, and females 46.22%. Kafrul has an average literacy rate of 43.53%, and the national average of 32.4% literate.

Administration 
Kafrul has 1 Unions/Wards, 16 Mauzas/Mahallas, and 4 villages.

See also
 Upazilas of Bangladesh
 Districts of Bangladesh
 Divisions of Bangladesh

References

Thanas of Dhaka